Karkak Valley is a valley in central Afghanistan, located in Bamyan province, 120 km west of Kabul province.

The famous Buddhist mural named "The Hunter King" (7-8th centuries CE) shows a typically local royal figure seated on a throne, his bow and arrows on the side. He wears a triple-crescent crown which has been compared to the triple-crescent crowns on the coinage found in northeastern Afghanistan in the area of Zabulistan, such as a coin found in Ghazni. Late 7th to early 8th century CE. Other authors have attributed the triple-crescent crown to Hephthalite influence. The painting may be an allegory of a King abandoning violence, particularly the hunting of animals, and converting to Buddhism.

Murals from Kakrak

See also 

 Bamyan Province
 Valleys of Afghanistan

References 

 

Valleys of Afghanistan
Landforms of Bamyan Province
Hazarajat